This is a list of Turkish television related events from 1975.

Events
22 March - Turkey enters the Eurovision Song Contest for the first time with "Seninle Bir Dakika" performed by Semiha Yankı.

Debuts

Television shows

Ending this year

Births

See also
1975 in Turkey